Mira Louen (born 13 October 1985) is a German slalom canoeist who competed at the international level from 2005 to 2013.

She won a bronze medal in the C1 team event at the 2013 ICF Canoe Slalom World Championships in Prague. She also won one gold and one silver medal in the C1 event at the European Canoe Slalom Championships.

She retired after the 2013 season and became German national coach for the U23-team.

References

German female canoeists
Living people
1985 births
Medalists at the ICF Canoe Slalom World Championships